The highest-selling albums and EPs in the United States are ranked in the Billboard 200, which is published by Billboard magazine. The data are compiled by Nielsen Soundscan based on each album's weekly physical and digital sales. In 2008, 38 albums advanced to the peak position of the chart.

Singer-songwriter Taylor Swift's Fearless is her first number-one album and had the longest run among the releases that have reached peak position in 2008, spending 11 non-consecutive weeks beginning with the issue dated November 29 and continuing into the 2009 chart year. She is the only singer to have achieved the longest-running album as a country female recording act in the Billboard 200 history. Swift is now ranked fifth on the list of solo female artists with the longest-running number-one album in Billboard history, tied with veterans Mariah Carey and Whitney Houston. Other albums with extended chart runs include Jack Johnson's fifth studio album, Sleep Through the Static, and Metallica's ninth studio album, Death Magnetic; each spent three straight weeks on the chart. Three soundtrack albums topped the chart in 2008: Juno, Mamma Mia! and Twilight.

Hip hop artist Lil Wayne's Tha Carter III is the highest-selling album of 2008 in the US, selling 2.874 million copies since its release. The album attained the most sales in a week, netting over one million units after a week of release, a feat previously accomplished in 2005. The second best-selling album of the year is alternative rock band Coldplay's Viva la Vida or Death and All His Friends with 2.144 million copies sold, followed by Swift's Fearless with 2.112 million. It is also the best-selling album in digital format, having topped the Billboard Top Digital Albums of 2008. Alternative rock band Radiohead's In Rainbows had the most vinyl albums sold in 2008, amounting to 26,000 units.

Pop singer Madonna scored her seventh number-one album, Hard Candy, making her the female act with the second most number-one albums in the United States. R&B singer Mariah Carey earned her sixth number-one album in 2008 with E=MC², tying her with R&B singer Janet Jackson for third place for most number-one albums by a female act. E=MC² opened at number one on the chart for selling 463,000 copies, outselling Carey's previous albums' debut figures. Neil Diamond achieved the first number one album of his career with Home Before Dark 42 years after his first chart entry.

Chart history

See also
2008 in music
List of number-one albums (United States)

References

Number-one albums
United States Albums
2008